The 1998 World Polo Championship was played in Santa Barbara, California, United States during August 1998 and was won by Argentina. This event brought together six teams from around the world in the Santa Barbara Polo & Racquet Club and San Diego Polo Club.

Final match

Final rankings

External links
FIP World Championship V

1998
Polo competitions in the United States
Sports in Santa Barbara, California
P
1998 in polo
World Polo Championship
20th century in California
History of Santa Barbara, California